Fred Nixon (26 September 1874 – 12 March 1933) was an Australian rules footballer who played with St Kilda in the Victorian Football League (VFL).

Nixon was recruited from the Corowa Football Club in the Ovens and Murray Football League.

Nixon returned to play with Corowa after his stint with St. Kilda.

In 1906 Nixon, the Corowa FC captain controversially leaves Corowa for financial reasons to go and play with Rutherglen Football Club.

Notes

External links 

1874 births
1933 deaths
Australian rules footballers from Victoria (Australia)
St Kilda Football Club players
Sportspeople from Wagga Wagga
Australian rules footballers from New South Wales